Convergence of parallel lines can refer to:

 In everyday life, the vanishing point phenomenon
 Non-Euclidean geometry in which Euclid's parallel postulate does not hold